Justin Piers Richard Madders (born 22 November 1972) is a British Labour Party politician. He has been the Member of Parliament (MP) for Ellesmere Port and Neston since the May 2015 general election.

Early life and education
Madders studied law at the University of Sheffield and worked as a solicitor, specialising in employment law, before entering politics.

Political career
Before his election to Parliament, he was the leader of the Labour opposition on Cheshire West and Chester Council and leader of Ellesmere Port and Neston Borough Council.

In the 2005 general election, Madders unsuccessfully stood in the safe Conservative seat of Tatton, coming second to the sitting MP, George Osborne.

He was appointed a member of the shadow health team in September 2015. He supported Owen Smith in the failed attempt to replace Jeremy Corbyn in the 2016 Labour leadership election. He resigned from his frontbench position in March 2019, after defying the Labour whip in a vote on a second Brexit referendum.

He was re-elected in the 2019 general election with a majority of 8,764.

Personal life
He is married and has three children.

Electoral record

2019 General Election

2017 General Election

2015 General Election

Notes

References

External links

1972 births
Alumni of the University of Sheffield
Labour Party (UK) MPs for English constituencies
Living people
UK MPs 2015–2017
UK MPs 2017–2019
UK MPs 2019–present